Azaruddin Aziz (born 7 January 1971) is a former Malaysian footballer who was a midfielder for Pahang and the Malaysia national football team.

Career 
Aziz began playing at age 10 for his school's under-12 football team.

At 19, Azaruddin was the youngest player for the Pahang FA team after successfully attracting the attention of the Hungarian coach, Gyorgy Syager. Gyorgy convinced him to join the team.

Coaching career 
After retiring as a player, Azaruddin earned his coaching license and became an assistant coach for the under-19 state squad. In 2006, he took an assistant coaching position for the Sukma state squad. In 2007, he became Head Coach at the Pahang Football Academy and also spent two years coaching the Gold Cup squad Rulers of Pahang.

He is currently head coach for Pahang's U21s team.

Achievements

International 
 Runners-up Tiger Cup 1996

Club 
With Pahang FA
 Champion 1992 Malaysia Cup
 Runners-up 1994, 1995, 1997 Malaysia Cup
 Champion 1992, 1995 M-League

References

External links 
 Lepaskan tawaran IPTA, bangga bantu Pahang
 Pahang 1994
 Sabah muff penalty as Pahang come away as winner
 UMP dan UniKL Catat Keputusan Seri
 Pahang pesta gol
 Azizul, Azaruddin revive Pahang hopes
 Dua kelab semakin garang

1971 births
Malaysian footballers
Living people
People from Pahang
Malaysian people of Malay descent
Association football midfielders
Footballers at the 1994 Asian Games
Asian Games competitors for Malaysia
Sri Pahang FC players